Xenothictis atriflora is a species of moth of the  family Tortricidae. It is found on Fiji.

References

	

Moths described in 1930
Archipini